Psammophis elegans, the elegant sand racer, is a species of psammophiid snake. It is found in tropical Africa.

See also 
 List of reptiles of Ghana

References 

Psammophis
Reptiles described in 1802